Jacob Muntaz Scipio (born January 10, 1993) is an English actor and writer. 

In 2016, Scipio co-founded CPO Productions. In that time he has written and starred in The Writers Group (2018) and Cowboys & Angels (2016), short films that premiered at the Cannes Court Métrage and London screenings at the British Film Institute.

In 2020, he played villain Armando Aretas in the action comedy Bad Boys for Life, directed by Adil El Arbi and Bilall Fallah, and starring Will Smith and Martin Lawrence.

Scipio's acting career started in television with leading roles in Some Girls (BBC), As the Bell Rings (Disney) and White Teeth (Channel 4).

Education, early life and career 

Scipio was born in Islington, London, England, and has Indo-Guyanese and English ancestry. Scipio attended St. Michael's Church of England Primary School in Highgate, then continued his studies at Fortismere School in Muswell Hill, going on to complete his education at the University of Essex where he was awarded with a Bachelor of Arts in Film and Literature.

Scipio's acting career began when he landed his first role at the age of 9 months in an episode of the Screen One series entitled Bambino Mio, playing the adopted son of Julie Walters. Throughout his studies he continued to act, starring in a number of lead roles in television, film and theatre, including the Channel 4 adaptation of Zadie Smith’s White Teeth, where at aged 9 he played the roles of twin brothers ‘Millat’ and ‘Magid’. He continued to act, appearing in Rodgers and Hammerstein's The King and I as ‘Prince Chulalongkorn’ opposite Elaine Paige at the London Palladium.

Film career
In January 2020, Scipio played the lead villain, Armando Aretas, in Bad Boys for Life. A few months later he starred in The Outpost, a true story of American soldiers in the Battle of Kamdesh. Scipio played Justin T. Gallegos, a US army Staff Sgt. who was awarded the Distinguished Service Cross.

Scipio appeared in Last Looks and Without Remorse. Scipio was later cast in the upcoming 2022 film, The Expendables 4.

Television career
In 2008, Scipio played the role of Bip in the second series of As the Bell Rings. His next role came in the form of the 'Kerwhizzitor' in the popular CBeebies show Kerwhizz, where he hosts the show then comments on the race. Scipio then went on to star in the 2012 Life In My Shoes production Undefeated, a HIV awareness campaign that was screened at the 2012 Cannes Film Festival in the Short Film Corner. In 2013 he played the role of 'Tyler Blaine' in the second series of the hit BBC Three comedy Some Girls. Other roles include 'Lewis' in CBBC's "Dixi", and 'Thomas Hillmorton', a Shakespearean ghost in "Dani's Castle" which aired on 1 September 2015. which was released in 2014

In January 2021, it was announced that Scipio was cast as Michael Vargas in the upcoming Netflix thriller series Pieces of Her, which is adapted from the Karin Slaughter novel of the same name.

Filmography

Film

Television

References

External links
 

English male film actors
English people of Indo-Guyanese descent
English male television actors
English male voice actors
1993 births
21st-century English male actors
Male actors from London
Living people